Troll and I is an action-adventure video game developed by Spiral House and published by Maximum Games for Microsoft Windows, PlayStation 4, Xbox One and Nintendo Switch.

Plot
A young boy named Otto forms a bond with a giant troll which is being pursued by a merciless hunter. It is set in a post-World War II Scandinavia.

Gameplay
The troll is capable of powerful attacks that can defeat enemies with a single blow, whilst Otto relies on lighter and more nimble attacks. The two need to work together to solve puzzles. It includes local split-screen multiplayer.

Development
The game was originally going to be published by Square Enix under their Square Enix Collective initiative, in which they ran surveys to see if the public would crowdfund games from independent developers. It was given the greenlight after a voting poll asking if people would support it on a crowdfunding campaign ended with 92% of voters saying yes and 8% voting no.

It was announced that it would instead be published by Maximum Games on 14 December 2016.

Reception

Troll and I received "generally unfavourable" reviews, according to review aggregator Metacritic.

References

2017 video games
Action-adventure games
Cooperative video games
Multiplayer and single-player video games
Nintendo Switch games
PlayStation 4 games
Trolls in popular culture
Video games developed in the United Kingdom
Windows games
Xbox One games
Maximum Games games
Spiral House games